The Community Mutual Group was the trading name of Regional Australia Bank until it re-branded in July 2016. Based in the New England, North West, Upper Hunter and Dubbo regions of New South Wales, The Community Mutual Group also traded under the names New England Mutual, Hunter Mutual, and Orana Mutual throughout the areas of its branch network.

It was the largest inland credit union in Australia, serving a large area of the state from Singleton in the south, to Tenterfield in the north, east to Walcha and west to Cobar. As of 2012, it had a base of almost 70,000 members and an asset base of almost $1 billion.

New England Credit Union (NECU) was formed in 1982 from the merger of three existing unions based in the Armidale and New England regions. The New England Mutual branch has undergone the most mergers, while Orana Credit Union and Hunter Mutual were merged into NECU in 2008 and 2010 respectively.

In 2012 it left the RediATM network to become a member of the Westpac ATM network.

In July 2016 The Community Mutual Group began trading as Regional Australia Bank.

Name and merger history
The three original credit unions that merged to create the New England Credit Union were the University of New England Staff Credit Union (established 1969), Armidale Credit Union (established 1971) and the New England Local Government Employee's Credit Union (established 1970). In 2004, it merged with the Peel Valley Credit Union (established 1983), itself made up of mergers between Peel Cunningham County Council Employee's Credit Union (established 1967), Tamworth and District Local Government Employee's Credit Union (established 1971) and East-West Airlines Credit Union (established 1991).

In 2008, NECU merged with the Orana Credit Union, which was established in 1968 as the Dubbo Community Credit Union, changing its name in 1980. Two years later, NECU completed a merger with Hunter Mutual, which was founded in 1968 as the Upper Hunter Local Government Employee's Credit Union. In 1971, the name was changed to the Upper Hunter Credit Union, and in 2004, re-branded again to Hunter Mutual.

As part of the NECU–Hunter Mutual merger, it was decided to keep the Hunter Mutual name and base a new identity as The Community Mutual Group throughout the three service areas, and locally as Hunter Mutual, New England Mutual and Orana Mutual.

References

Credit unions of Australia